Sarat Chandra Chattopadhyay, alternatively spelt as Sarat Chandra Chatterjee (15 September 1876 – 16 January 1938), was a Bengali novelist and short story writer of the early 20th century. Most of his works deal with the lifestyle, tragedy and struggle of the village people and the contemporary social practices that prevailed in Bengal. He remains the most popular, translated, and adapted Indian author of all time. His novels have been made into 44 films. The following is a list of films made on Sarat Chandra Chattopadhyay's novels or stories:

Films

As writer

Web Series and Television Shows

As writer

References

External links

Filmographies
Indian filmographies